In geometry, the order-4 square hosohedral honeycomb is a regular space-filling tessellation (or honeycomb) with Schläfli symbol {2,4,4}. It has 4 square hosohedra {2,4} around each edge.  In other words, it is a packing of infinitely tall square columns.  It is a degenerate honeycomb in Euclidean space, but can be seen as a projection onto the sphere. Its vertex figure, a square tiling is seen on each hemisphere.

Images
Stereographic projections of spherical projection, with all edges being projected into circles.

Related honeycombs 

It is a part of a sequence of honeycombs with a square tiling vertex figure:

Truncated order-4 square hosohedral honeycomb 

The {2,4,4} honeycomb can be truncated as t{2,4,4} or {}×{4,4}, Coxeter diagram , seen as a layer of cubes, partially shown here with alternately colored cubic cells. Thorold Gosset identified this semiregular infinite honeycomb as a cubic semicheck.

The alternation of this honeycomb, consists of infinite square pyramids and infinite tetrahedrons, between 2 square tilings.

See also 
 Order-6 triangular hosohedral honeycomb
 Order-7 tetrahedral honeycomb
 List of regular polytopes

References 

 The Beauty of Geometry: Twelve Essays (1999), Dover Publications,  (Chapter 10, Regular Honeycombs in Hyperbolic Space)

Honeycombs (geometry)